Arwel Hughes OBE (25 August 1909 – 23 September 1988) was a Welsh orchestral conductor and composer.

Life and career
Hughes was born in Rhosllannerchrugog near Wrexham and was educated at Ruabon Grammar School and at the Royal College of Music, where he studied with Ralph Vaughan Williams and C. H. Kitson. Following his studies at the RCM he became organist at the church of St Philip and St James, Oxford, and in 1935 returned to Wales to join the staff of the BBC's music department. His duties included a great deal of conducting, and he used his position to champion the music of compatriots such as Grace Williams, David Wynne, and Alun Hoddinott; arguably to the detriment of his own musical legacy as a composer, though as a part of his role he was also called upon to compose, arrange and orchestrate music for live radio broadcasts.

Hughes became Head of Music at BBC Wales in 1965, holding the post until his retirement in 1971. He was appointed OBE in 1969 for his services to Welsh music and for organising the music for the Investiture of Charles, Prince of Wales, in the same year. From 1978 until 1986 he was Honorary Music Director of the Llangollen International Eisteddfod.

Music

Hughes' conducting and other professional duties left relatively little time for composing and considering the length of his career in music his output as a composer was comparatively small.

His romantic, lyrical musical language is conservative, even anachronistic in the wider context of twentieth-century British music, though relatively unusual for a Welsh composer. Hughes drew inspiration from Welsh literature, history, mythology, folk culture and the Welsh religious tradition: much of his program music draws in some way from these sources. His approach to this source material is firmly in the wider romantic tradition and not necessarily any different to that of composers of other nationalities to their own cultural contexts, it does provide a distinctly Welsh character to Hughes' music which can be seen in the (otherwise very different) music of his rough contemporaries Grace Williams and Daniel Jones.

His main legacy as a composer are perhaps his works for chorus and orchestra, including the large-scale oratorios, Dewi Sant (Saint David) and Pantycelyn, which exemplify his imagination and technical competence and combine the early twentieth century British tradition with his original harmonic language. Gweddi (A Prayer) is a shorter work containing haunting melodies which encapsulate the spirit of the composer.

For many years Arwel Hughes conducted performances by the Welsh National Opera, and his own two operas, Menna, to a libretto by Wyn Griffith, a tragedy based on a Welsh folk legend; and Serch yw’r Doctor ("Love’s the Doctor"), a comedy adapted by Saunders Lewis from Molière's L'Amour médecin, were produced by WNO in 1953 and 1960 respectively. These works played an important role in the development of opera in Wales, and demonstrate Hughes' lyricism and melodic originality.

Hushes' orchestral writing includes a Fantasia for Strings which has received many performances. From the 1940s onwards, he produced a stream of works for orchestra including Suite for Orchestra, Prelude for Orchestra (dedicated to the Youth of Wales), Anatiomaros, and a symphony. There are a quantity of songs and chamber music.

Hughes was the father of the Welsh orchestral conductor Owain Arwel Hughes.

Principal works

Opera
Menna (1950–51), libretto by Wyn Griffith (first performance 1953 at the Sophia Gardens Pavilion Cardiff by Welsh National Opera with Richard Lewis and Edith Osler)
Serch yw'r doctor (Love's the doctor), libretto by Saunders Lewis, after Molière's L'Amour médecin (first performance 1960 at the Sophia Gardens Pavilion Cardiff by Welsh National Opera)

Orchestral
Fantasia, strings, 1936
Anatiomaros, 1943
Prelude for Orchestra, 1945
Suite, 1947
Symphony, 1971
Legend: Owain Glyndŵr, 1979

Choral
Tydi a Roddaist (T. Rowland Hughes), chorus, piano, also arranged for female chorus, male chorus with orchestra, 1938
Gweddi (A Prayer) (liturgical text), S, chorus, strings (alternative version with full orchestra), 1944
Dewi Sant (Saint David) (A. T. Davies), S, T, B, chorus, orchestra, 1950
Pantycelyn (text arr. A. T. Davies), S, T, B, chorus, orchestra, 1963
Saint Francis (masque, G. James), S, T, narrator, chorus, orchestra 1965
Mab y Dyn (Son of Man) (cantata, biblical text), S, chorus, organ, 1967
The Beatitudes (biblical text) S, (T) TTBB, organ
In memoriam (Psalm 121), chorus, organ, 1969
Psalm 148, male chorus, 1970
Mass for Celebration, S, A, male chorus, orchestra without woodwind, 1977
Gloria Patri, SATB, orchestra, 1986

Miscellaneous
Three string quartets: 1948, 1976, 1983
Unfinished quartet 1932
Many arrangements of folk songs
Incidental music for radio and television

References

External links
 
 

1909 births
1988 deaths
Alumni of the Royal College of Music
Officers of the Order of the British Empire
People educated at Ruabon Grammar School
People from Rhosllanerchrugog
Welsh classical organists
British male organists
Welsh classical composers
Welsh male classical composers
Welsh composers
Welsh male composers
Welsh conductors (music)
British male conductors (music)
20th-century British conductors (music)
20th-century British composers
20th-century organists
20th-century British male musicians
Male classical organists
BBC music executives